Ernest Leslie McCormick (16 May 1906 – 28 June 1991) was an Australian cricketer who played in 12 Test matches from 1935 to 1938.

McCormick was an instrument-maker and jeweler. After the 1960–61 West Indies tour of Australia, Donald Bradman and the Australian Cricket Board of Control commissioned McCormick to create a perpetual trophy for winners of Test match series between the two teams. Its design incorporated a ball used in the tied Test and the Frank Worrell Trophy was named in honor of the West Indies captain.

References 

1906 births
1991 deaths
Australia Test cricketers
Victoria cricketers
Richmond cricketers
Australian cricketers
Cricketers from Melbourne
D. G. Bradman's XI cricketers
People from Carlton North, Victoria